Steam is vaporized water.

Steam or STEAM may also refer to:

Science and technology
 Steam (service), a software distribution platform by Valve
 Serial time-encoded amplified microscopy, an optical imaging method
 Stimulated echo acquisition mode, a type of nuclear magnetic resonance spectroscopy

Arts and entertainment
 Code Name: S.T.E.A.M., a 2015 video game

Music
 Steam (band), an American pop-rock group
 Steam (Archie Shepp album), 1976
 Steam (East 17 album), 1994
 "Steam" (East 17 song), 1994
 Steam (Ty Herndon album), 1999
 "Steam" (Ty Herndon song), 1999
 "Steam" (Peter Gabriel song), 1992

Film and television
 Steam, a 1945 short documentary film, director James E. Rogers, music Clifton Parker
 Steam (film), a 2007 American film
 Steam: The Turkish Bath, a 1997 Italian-Turkish-Spanish film
 Steam, a station ident for British television channel BBC Two from the 1991–2001 idents

Sports
 Summerland Steam, a Canadian ice hockey team in Summerland, British Columbia

United States
 Atlanta Steam, a women's American football team in Atlanta, Georgia
 Chicago Steam, an American Basketball Association team in Chicago, Illinois
 Lehigh Valley Steam, a soccer club in Lehigh Valley, Pennsylvania
 Queen City Steam, an ice hockey team in Evendale, Ohio
 Roanoke Steam, an arena football team in Roanoke, Virginia

Organisations
 STEAM – Museum of the Great Western Railway, Swindon, England
 Steam Brewing Company, a New Zealand microbrewery

Other uses
 Steam (poker), a mental state that adversely affects one's play
 STEAM Education (science, technology, engineering, arts, and mathematics), as collective fields of study; schools that use PBL or Project Based Learning to teach students
 Steaming, a cooking method

See also
 Steam power
 Steamed Hams
 Steampunk (disambiguation)
 Steamer (disambiguation)
 Steaming (disambiguation)